Artyom Vesyoly (Russian: Артём Весёлый; 17 September 1899 – 8 April 1938) was the pseudonym of Nikolai Ivanovich Kotshurov, a Soviet writer and poet.

Biography 
He was born into a poor working family and was himself a worker at the age of fourteen.

Vesyoly became a bolshevik after the February Revolution. He joined the Red Army in the Russian Civil War and was active in the Cheka. In the early 1920s, Vesyoly studied for some time at the Institute of Literature and Moscow State University, but did not graduate. He belonged to the Pereval group of writers and, from 1929, to the All-Russian Association of Proletarian Writers.

Vesyoly as known as the early illustrator of the Russian Civil War, representing the “ornamental” prose of the Pilnyak school. His main work is a novel about the Civil War, Russia, Washed in Blood 1924–1932. The author has also written the historical novel Yermak, about his conquest of Siberia.

In the late 1930s, Vesyoly who was a supporter of the United Opposition, fell victim to the Great Purge. In a private report from Nikolai Yezhov to Stalin, he claimed that Vesyoly had terrorist sentiments against the Soviet leadership.

He was arrested in October 1937 and executed on charges of involvement in the activities of a counter-revolutionary terrorist organization. His wife and three daughters were also sentenced to prison.

Artyom Vesyoly and his family were rehabilitated in 1956.

References

1899 deaths
1938 deaths
Soviet writers
Soviet poets
Soviet novelists
20th-century Russian novelists
20th-century Russian poets
20th-century Russian writers
Bolsheviks
Communist Party of the Soviet Union members
Great Purge victims from Russia
Soviet rehabilitations